Virtual math manipulatives are visual representations of concrete math manipulatives. They are digitally accessed through a variety of websites or apps through tablets, phones and computers. Virtual math manipulatives are modeled after concrete math manipulatives that are commonly used in classrooms to concretely represent abstract mathematical concepts and support student understanding of mathematical content.

The most common manipulatives include: base ten blocks, coins, blocks, tangrams, rulers, fraction bars, algebra tiles, geoboards, geometric plane, and solids figures. Students can engage virtually/digitally with the manipulatives mimicking the use the of the concrete math manipulatives.

Advantages and Disadvantages 
Classroom studies were conducted which investigated virtual manipulatives. The studies compare virtual manipulatives to concrete manipulatives and discuss some of its implications.

Advantages 
The observed learning benefits of virtual manipulatives includes providing detailed instruction and prompt evaluation for assigned tasks. Students were seen to apprehend concepts better since this style of learning appeals to digital natives. Virtual manipulatives can often provide explicit connections between visual and symbolic representations. Moreover, it signals to students when they’ve made a mistake which encourages them to reflect and revisit answers accordingly. Lastly, virtual manipulatives prove to be more convenient because it is more likely accessible at home than concrete manipulatives.

Disadvantages 
In comparison to concrete manipulatives, virtual manipulatives lack opportunities for learners and educators to physically touch objects, this is an immense disadvantage for kinesthetic learners. Educators are unable to follow learners thought process making it difficult to understand their comprehension levels. Moreover, virtual manipulatives are a form of digital learning. One of the drawbacks of digital learning is an increase in computer dependence as it limits students learning abilities. It does not encourage learners to independently find answers and locate their mistakes. Teaching preferences often include guiding students through answers only when they are unable to grasp content or find difficulty comprehending questions. Lastly, Hunts et al.state that learning mathematics through the use of virtual manipulatives feels more like a "do" experience rather than a learn and explore learning experience.

Special Education 
Although relatively new, virtual manipulatives can support learning mathematics for all students, which include those with learning disabilities and ELL learners. If they are used wisely, virtual manipulatives can provide students with opportunities for guided discovery, which can help them to build a better understanding of mathematical concepts and ultimately exhibit measurable learning skills. Virtual manipulatives can be included into the general academic curriculum as assistive technology and should not just be used for its novelty.

Studies  on the use of virtual manipulatives in mathematics for students with learning disabilities advocate the use of virtual manipulatives in mathematics for students with learning disabilities as it can favour:

Practicality: Virtual manipulatives help where physical manipulation is not physically possible, it offers opportunities for repeated practice, it is accessible (i.e. accessed by phones, ipads, etc.) and cost effective (i.e. free or low cost).

Student independence: Virtual manipulatives allow for instant feedback and built-in scaffolding, which allows for individualized instruction and for students to build on their learning skills independently and effectively, without the presence of a teacher. Virtual manipulatives offer students the opportunity to double check their work and have visual representations of mathematical problems to solve.  

Learning beyond the classroom: Virtual manipulatives provide opportunity for learning outside the classroom, as it is transportable.  It can also allow students to share their results with their teacher beyond the classroom.

Considerations for Stakeholders 
To effectively use virtual manipulatives in mathematics, stakeholders should: assess the severity of student’s learning and cognitive disabilities as well as their needs prior to implementing virtual manipulatives; evaluate mathematical applications using rubrics for students with learning disabilities to validate the effectiveness of the application in connection with the learning goals; consider the lack of or limited access to technology and funding in some schools; and evaluate student engagement to ensure that students are actively learning and achieving learning goals through the use of virtual manipulatives.

Notable collections of virtual manipulatives
Wolfram Demonstrations Project

http://demonstrations.wolfram.com/

Wolfram Demonstrations Project contains around 11,000 Virtual manipulatives for math, science, and engineering. They are provided in CDF format together with source code.

Didax Free Manipulatives Library

http://www.didax.com/virtual-manipulatives-for-math

Didax is the U.S. branch of Philip & Tacey, Ltd of Hampshire, UK, which developed Unifix₢ Cubes in 1960, a popular math manipulative used to teach counting and operations. Unifix cubes were created to replace poppet beads, which rolled off student desks and were expensive to manufacture. The virtual manipulatives are designed to be faithful to their physical counterparts and include minimal navigation or symbolic content.

Shodor Interactivate Activities

http://www.shodor.org/interactivate/activities/

Shodor is a national resource for computational science education. They have offered online education tools such as Interactivate and the Computational Science Education Reference Desk (CSERD) since 1994. The activities are sorted from Grade 3 through Undergraduate.

National Library of Virtual Manipulatives

http://nlvm.usu.edu/

Utah State University has offered this collection of internet-based manipulatives since 1999. The activities are sorted from Pre-Kindergarten through High School. The manipulatives were initially developed in Java.

Illuminations: Activities

http://illuminations.nctm.org/Default.aspx

Illuminations have been found on a section of the website for the National Council of Teachers of Mathematics since 2000. Students and teachers from Pre-Kindergarten through High School can use these interactivities.

MSTE at the University of Illinois
 The Office for Mathematics, Science, and Technology Education (MSTE) at the University of Illinois at Urbana-Champaign has two good resources. The MSTE Online Resource Catalog has existed since 1994. Also, M2T2 includes an extensive List of Mathematics Applets.

According to their website, "Mathematics Materials for Tomorrow's Teachers (M2T2) are a set of mathematics modules created in the spring of 2000 by a team consisting of teachers, administrators, university researchers, mathematicians, graduate students, and members of the Illinois State Board of Education." They are five modules. Each module is connected to one of the goals for mathematics in the Illinois Learning Standards. The content is at a middle school level.

References

 Moyer, P. S., Bolyard, J. J., & Spikell, M. A. (2000). What are virtual manipulatives? [Online]. Teaching Children Mathematics, 8(6), 372-377. Available: 
 Moyer, P. S., Niezgoda, D., & Stanley, J. (2005). Young children's use of virtual manipulatives and other forms of mathematical representations. In W. J. Masalaski & P. C. Elliot (Eds.), Technology-Supported Mathematics Learning Environments (pp. 17–34). Reston, VA: National Council of Teachers of Mathematics.
Ortiz, Enrique (2017).Pre-service teachers’ ability to identify and implement cognitive levels in mathematics learning. Issues in the Undergraduate Mathematics Preparation of School Teachers (IUMPST): The Journal (Technology), 3, pp. 1–14. Retrieved from http://www.k-12prep.math.ttu.edu/journal/3.technology/volume.shtml pdf: http://www.k-12prep.math.ttu.edu/journal/3.technology/ortiz01/article.pdf
Ortiz, Enrique, Eisenreich, Heidi & Tapp, Laura (2019). Physical and virtual manipulative framework conceptions of undergraduate pre-service teachers. International Journal for Mathematics Teaching and Learning, 20(1), 62-84. Retrieved from https://www.cimt.org.uk/ijmtl/index.php/IJMTL/article/view/116

External links
 Virtual Manipulatives in Mathematics Education.
 Virtual manipulatives in mathematics education: A theoretical framework.
Pre-service teachers’ ability to identify and implement cognitive levels in mathematics learning. or http://www.k-12prep.math.ttu.edu/journal/3.technology/volume.shtml  
Physical and virtual manipulative framework conceptions of undergraduate pre-service teachers.

Mathematical manipulatives